Louis Anthony Stricker (26 May 1884 – 5 February 1960) was a South African cricketer who played in 13 Tests from 1910 to 1912.

Of German parentage, Stricker was born in Beaconsfield, Kimberley. A few years later his family moved to Johannesburg, where he attended the Marist Brothers school.

A batsman, Stricker scored two centuries in first-class cricket: 103 for Transvaal against the touring English team in 1909–10 (when he shared an opening partnership of 215 with Billy Zulch), and 146 against South Australia when he toured Australia with the South Africans in 1910-11. He was less successful in Test cricket, with a top score of 48 in his 13 matches, scored twice: against Australia in Adelaide in 1910–11, when South Africa beat Australia for the first time, and against Australia at Lord's in the 1912 Triangular Tournament. His brother Henry was also a first-class cricketer.

References

External links
 
 Louis Stricker at CricketArchive

1884 births
1960 deaths
South Africa Test cricketers
South African cricketers
Gauteng cricketers
Cricketers from Kimberley, Northern Cape